HVDC Norway–Germany may refer to the following proposed high-voltage direct current interconnection projects between Norway and Germany:
 NORD.LINK
 NorGer